The following lists bands or artists that are played on adult album alternative radio stations, or have been cited as part of the adult alternative pop/rock music genre.

0-9
.38 Special
10,000 Maniacs
10cc
The B-52's

A
A Flock of Seagulls
A Tribe Called Quest
A-ha
ABBA
ABC
AC/DC
Ryan Adams
Adele
The Airborne Toxic Event
Alberta Cross
Alice In Chains
Alice Cooper
Lily Allen
All American Rejects
The Allman Brothers Band
Gregg Allman
Girls Aloud
AJR
alt-J 
Ambrosia
American Authors
Tori Amos
Anderson Paak
The Angels
The Animals
Fiona Apple
Aqualung
Arcade Fire
Tasmin Archer
Arctic Monkeys
Jann Arden
Arlo Parks
Louis Armstrong
Joseph Arthur
Ásgeir
Asia
Asleep at the Wheel
Assembly of Dust
Nicole Atkins
Atlas Genius
Augustana
The Avett Brothers

B
Bachman-Turner Overdrive
Badfinger
Badly Drawn Boy
Bahamas
Bakar
Bananarama
The Band
Dazz Band
The Bangles
Band of Horses
Sara Bareilles
Barenaked Ladies
The Baseball Project
Bear Hands
The Beach Boys
Beastie Boys
The Beatles
The Beautiful South
Beck
Howie Beck
Jeff Beck
Bee Gees
The Bees / A Band of Bees
Beirut
Belle Brigade
Ben Folds Five
Chuck Berry
Best Coast
Better Than Ezra
Big Head Todd & The Monsters
Andrew Bird
The Black Crowes
The Black Keys
The Black Eyed Peas
Black Pumas
Blessid Union of Souls
Björk
Aloe Blacc
James Blake
Blonde Redhead
Blondie
Blind Faith
Blind Melon
Blue Merle
The Blue Nile
Blue October
Blue Öyster Cult
Blue Rodeo
Blues Traveler
The Moody Blues
James Blunt
Blur
Bon Iver
Boozoo Bajou
Børns
Boston (band)
Boy & Bear
Boy Pablo
Boygenius
Butterfly Boucher
David Bowie
Charles Bradley
The Bravery
The Breeders
Edie Brickell & the New Bohemians
Broken Bells
Leon Bridges
Jonatha Brooke
Meredith Brooks
Marc Broussard
James Brown
Jackson Browne
Michael Bublé
Jeff Buckley
Bully
Kate Bush
Bush (British band)
John Butler Trio
David Byrne
The Byrds

C
Cage The Elephant
Camila Cabello
Carla Olson 
Caro Emerald
Colbie Caillat
Cake
Carbon Leaf
The Cardigans
Mariah Carey
Brandi Carlile
Belinda Carlisle
Vanessa Carlton
Reeve Carney
The Cars
Neko Case
Johnny Cash
Chance the Rapper
Tracy Chapman
Chicago
The Chicks
Toni Childs
The Church
The Civil Wars
Clairo
Eric Clapton
Gary Clark, Jr.
Guy Clark
The Clash
Kelly Clarkson
Tom Cochrane
Bruce Cockburn
Joe Cocker
Marc Cohn
Cold War Kids
Coldplay
Jude Cole
Lloyd Cole
Paula Cole
Collective Soul
Phil Collins
Shawn Colvin
Bad Company
The Corrs
Matt Costa
Elvis Costello
Christopher Cross
Counting Crows
Cowboy Junkies
Cowboy Mouth
Cracker
The Cranberries
Crash Test Dummies
Cream (band)
Creedence Clearwater Revival
King Crimson
Crosby, Stills, Nash & Young
Sheryl Crow
Crowded House
Mötley Crüe
Ice Cube
Jim Cuddy
Cuff the Duke
Jamie Cullum
The Cure
Cypress Hill
Billy Ray Cyrus
Miley Cyrus

D
Daft Punk
The Dandy Warhols
Vanessa Daou
Dave Matthews Band
Dave Clark Five
Paul Davis
Dawes
Howie Day
dc Talk
De La Soul
Dead or Alive
Deadmau5
Death Cab for Cutie
The Decemberists
Def Leppard
Gavin DeGraw
Del Amitri
Demillusion
Lana Del Rey
Delta Spirit
Rocco DeLuca
Brett Dennen
Depeche Mode
Joy Division
Derek & the Dominos
Derek Trucks Band
Destiny's Child
Devo
Dido
Dinosaur Jr.
Dire Straits
Thomas Dolby
Pussycat Dolls
Doobie Brothers
The Doors
Luke Doucet
Mike Doughty
Nick Drake
Drake
Drive By Truckers
Duran Duran
Bob Dylan
Jakob Dylan

E
The Eagles
Justin Townes Earle
Earth, Wind & Fire
Anderson East
Echo & the Bunnymen
Echosmith
EDEN
Edward Sharpe and the Magnetic Zeros
Kathleen Edwards
Eels
Mark Eitzel
Billie Eilish
Elephant Stone
Elliphant
Eminem
Enya
Melissa Etheridge
Sharon Van Etten
Europe
Eurythmics
Evanescence
George Ezra

F
Faces
Small Faces
Donald Fagen
Fair to Midland
The Fall of Troy
Fall Out Boy
Family of the Year
Fanfarlo
Fastball
Fatboy Slim
Feist
Fergie
Rebecca Ferguson
Filter
A Fine Frenzy
Finn Brothers
Craig Finn
Neil Finn
First Aid Kit
Jeremy Fisher
Fitz and the Tantrums
Ella Fitzgerald
Five for Fighting
The Fixx
The Flaming Lips
Fleet Foxes
Fleetwood Mac
Flight of the Conchords
Florence & the Machine
John Fogerty
Ben Folds
Fontaines D.C.
Foreigner
Foo Fighters
Julia Fordham
Foster the People
Four Tops
Donavon Frankenreiter
Aretha Franklin
Michael Franti & Spearhead
Franz Ferdinand
The Fray
Freddy Fresh
Free
Fun.

G
G. Love & Special Sauce
Peter Gabriel
Lady Gaga
The Gap Band
Garbage
Art Garfunkel
Jack Garratt
Marvin Gaye
Genesis
Andy Gibb
Gin Blossoms
Givers
Glass Animals
Donald Glover
Gnarls Barkley
Goldfrapp
Gomez
The Go-Gos
Goo Goo Dolls
Gorillaz
Gotye
Ellie Goulding
Grace Potter & the Nocturnals
Graffiti6
Andy Grammer
Grand Funk Railroad
Jenn Grant
Grant Lee Buffalo
Grateful Dead
David Gray
Great Lake Swimmers
Al Green
Green Day
The Greg Kihn Band
Patty Griffin
Grizzly Bear
Grouplove
The Growlers
Guns N' Roses
Guster

H
Trevor Hall
Hall & Oates
Halsey
Ernie Halter
Sarah Harmer
Fifth Harmony
Ben Harper
George Harrison
PJ Harvey
Juliana Hatfield
Mayer Hawthorne
Warren Haynes
Heart
The Head and the Heart
Heartless Bastards
The Jimi Hendrix Experience
Joe Henry
Kristin Hersh
Katie Herzig
John Hiatt
Missy Higgins
Lauryn Hill
Hockey
The Hollies
Buddy Holly
Hootie & the Blowfish
Hooverphonic
Bruce Hornsby
House Of Pain
Howlin Maggie
The Human League
Van Hunt
Hurray for the Riff Raff
Eric Hutchinson

I
Icon for Hire
Idles
Billy Idol
Iggy Pop
iLoveMakonnen
Imagine Dragons
Natalie Imbruglia
Incubus
Indigo Girls
The Innocence Mission
Interpol
INXS
Iron & Wine
Chris Isaak
Jason Isbell
Islands
Ivy

J
Jet
Joan Jett
Joe Jackson
Michael Jackson
Janet Jackson
The Jam
Pearl Jam
Ram Jam
James
James Gang
Jason Mraz
Rick James
John Mayer
Tommy James & The Shondells
Jamiroquai
Sarah Jarosz
Jars of Clay
The Jayhawks
Jem
Jewel
Billy Joel
Elton John
Jack Johnson
Freedy Johnston
Norah Jones
Janis Joplin
Journey
Bon Jovi
Vance Joy
Judybats
Damien Jurado
Hobo Johnson

K
Kaleo
Israel Kamakawiwoʻole
Kansas
Keane
Mat Kearney
Keb' Mo
Paul Kelly
Khruangbin
The Killers
B.B. King
Kings of Leon
The Kinks
Kiss
Michael Kiwanuka
Jann Klose
Mark Knopfler
Beyonce Knowles
Kool & the Gang
The Kooks
Kopecky
Kraftwerk
Lenny Kravitz
Chantal Kreviazuk

L
Lady A.
Lake Street Dive
Miranda Lambert
Ray LaMontagne
Land of Talk
k.d. lang
Daniel Lanois
Greg Laswell
Cyndi Lauper
LCD Soundsystem
Led Zeppelin
Amos Lee
Amy Lee
The Lemonheads
John Lennon
Julian Lennon
Sondre Lerche
Lifehouse
Lighthouse Family
Lightning Seeds
Linkin Park
Lissie
Little Dragon
Los Lobos
Local Natives
Lisa Loeb
Lizzo
Los Lonely Boys
Jennifer Lopez
Mary Lou Lord
Lorde
Loverboy
Lyle Lovett
Low Millions
Nick Lowe
The Lumineers
Les Luthiers
Jeff Lynne
Shelby Lynne
Lynyrd Skynyrd

M
Madness
Bob Marley
Martha and the Vandellas
Marvellettes
Massive Attack
John Mayall
Michael McDonald
MC5
M83
Fleetwood Mac
Meg Mac
Magnet
Tkay Maidza
Matchbox Twenty
Aimee Mann
Manfred Mann
Manfred Mann's Earth Band
Marina and the Diamonds
Mark Mallman
Laura Marling
Maroon 5
Bruno Mars
Wendy Matthews
Imelda May
John Mayer
Matt Mays
Mazzy Star
Edwin McCain
Erin McCarley
Jesse McCartney
Paul McCartney
Melissa McClelland
Kirsty MacColl
Sarah McLachlan
Megadeth
John Mellencamp
Katie Melua
Maria Mena
Shawn Mendes
Natalie Merchant
Metric
MGMT
Ingrid Michaelson
Amy Millan
Steve Miller Band
Tor Miller
Missing Persons
Anaïs Mitchell
Moby
Modest Mouse
Janelle Monáe
The Monkees
Montgomery Gentry
Monsters of Folk
Moon Taxi
James Morrison
Van Morrison
Alanis Morissette
Mother Mother
Motörhead
Smash Mouth
Alison Moyet
Melanie Martinez
Jason Mraz
Mudcrutch
Maria Muldaur
Shawn Mullins
Mumford & Sons
Muse
Kacey Musgraves
My Friend Steve
My Morning Jacket
Billie Myers
Freddie Mercury

N
Nada Surf
Leona Naess
Anna Nalick 
Leigh Nash
Matt Nathanson
Needtobreathe
The Neighbourhood
New Order
The New Pornographers
The New Radicals
Gary Numan
Randy Newman
Nickel Creek
Willie Nelson
Stevie Nicks
Willie Nile
Nirvana
No Doubt
Noah and the Whale
Heather Nova
Justin Nozuka
Paolo Nutini

O
Oasis
The Ocean Blue
Sinéad O'Connor
Of Monsters and Men
O.A.R.
Oingo Boingo
OK Go
Old 97's
Angel Olsen
One Eskimo
OneRepublic
Yoko Ono
Plastic Ono Band
Roy Orbison
Electric Light Orchestra
Orchestral Manoeuvres in the Dark
Beth Orton
Joan Osborne
Our Lady Peace
Outkast
Buck Owens
Owl City
Ozzy Osbourne

P
P!nk
Robert Palmer
Panic! At The Disco
Pantera
Parachute
Paramore
Emerson Lake & Palmer
Dolly Parton
Pearl Jam
Michael Penn
Perfume Genius
Carl Perkins
Christina Perri
Katy Perry
Pet Shop Boys
Peter Bjorn and John
Tom Petty
Liz Phair
Phantogram
Grant Lee Phillips
Phillip Phillips
Sam Phillips
Wilson Phillips
Phish
Phoebe Bridgers
Phoenix
The Pierces
The Pillbugs
Pink Floyd
Sex Pistols
Pixies
Plain White T's
Robert Plant
Plants and Animals
Joel Plaskett
Poe
The Pogues
The Pointer Sisters
Poison
Caroline Polachek
The Police
John Popper
Willy Porter
Portishead
Portugal. The Man
Elvis Presley
Billy Preston
Pretenders
Judas Priest
Prince
Procol Harum
The Proclaimers
The Psychedelic Furs
Public Enemy
Punch Brothers
Puppini Sisters
Deep Purple

Q
Queen
Queens of the Stone Age

R
R.E.M.
REO Speedwagon
Radiohead
Rage Against the Machine
Rainbow
Bonnie Raitt
Night Ranger
Sugar Ray
Chris Rea
The Record Company
Red Hot Chili Peppers
Lou Reed
The Replacements
Chris Rice
Rihanna
Amy Rigby
Rilo Kiley
Little Richard
Rise Against
Justin Roberts
Sam Roberts
Robbie Robertson
Smokey Robinson
Kenny Rogers
Rolling Stones
My Chemical Romance
Gavin Rossdale
Josh Rouse
Ronettes
Roxette
Run the Jewels
Todd Rundgren
Bic Runga
Rush
Rusted Root
Run DMC
Serena Ryder
Rymes with Orange

S
Salt-N-Pepa
San Cisco
Savage Garden
St. Paul and The Broken Bones
Scars on 45
Boz Scaggs
Bob Schneider
Travis Scott
Seal
Seether
Bob Seger
Ron Sexsmith
Scorpions
DJ Shadow
Ryan Shaw
Jules Shear
Ed Sheeran
Duncan Sheik
Vonda Shepard
Kenny Wayne Shepherd
The Shins
Jane Siberry
Silversun Pickups
Paul Simon
Simple Minds
Simple Plan
Simply Red
Frank Sinatra
Nancy Sinatra
Sister Hazel
JoJo Siwa
Sixpence None the Richer
Sarah Slean
Slipknot
Elliott Smith
Patti Smith Group
Sam Smith
The Smithereens
The Smiths
Sneaker Pimps
Snow Patrol
Jill Sobule
Soccer Mommy
Songhoy Blues
Sonic Youth
Sorry
Soul Asylum
Soul Coughing
Regina Spektor
Spencer Davis Group
Spice Girls
Spin Doctors
Split Enz
Spoon
Sports Team
Squeeze
Buffalo Springfield
Bruce Springsteen
Gwen Stefani
Hailee Steinfeld
Steely Dan
Stereolab
Steve Miller Band
Steve Winwood
Rod Stewart
Stickman
Sting
Joss Stone
Stone Temple Pilots
C. W. Stoneking
The Stooges
Ringo Starr
The Strokes
Sturgill Simpson
The Strumbellas
The Struts
Styx
The Sundays
SuperHeavy
Supertramp
The Supremes
Matthew Sweet
The Swell Season
Taylor Swift
Sylvan Esso

T
Travis Barker
T.I.
Taco
Talking Heads
Tame Impala
James Taylor
Tears for Fears
Tedeschi Trucks Band
Teenage Fanclub
Tegan and Sara
Television
The Telnyuk Sisters
The Temptations
Texas
They Might Be Giants
Third Eye Blind
Thirty Seconds to Mars
Thompson Twins
Justin Timberlake
Tired Pony
Cal Tjader
TLC
Toad the Wet Sprocket
Tommy Tutone
Toots and the Maytals
Tove Lo
Traffic
Train
Meghan Trainor
Trashcan Sinatras
Travis
Cheap Trick
The Tubes
KT Tunstall
TV on the Radio
Jeff Tweedy
Two Door Cinema Club
T. Rex

U
U.S. Girls
Carrie Underwood
U2
Ultravox
Umphrey's McGee

V
Vampire Weekend
Van Ghost
Van Halen
Van Zant
Keith Varon
Eddie Vedder
Suzanne Vega
Laura Veirs
Jackie Venson
Gene Vincent
The Velvet Underground
Velvet Revolver
Veruca Salt
Vertical Horizon
The Verve
The Verve Pipe
Kurt Vile
Vintage Trouble
En Vogue

W
 The Wailin' Jennys
 Rufus Wainwright
 Tom Waits
 Walk the Moon
 The Wallflowers
 J Roddy Walston and the Business
 Wang Chung
 War
 ZZ Ward
 Washed Out
 The Waterboys 
 Nick Waterhouse
 Waxahatchee
 The Weakerthans
 Ween
 Weezer
 Paul Westerberg
 Jack White
 Whitesnake
 White Denim
 The White Stripes
 White Town
 The Guess Who
 The Who
 Traveling Wilburys
 Will I. Am
 Wilco
 Dar Williams
 Joy Williams
 Lucinda Williams
 Pharrell Williams
 Robbie Williams
 Victoria Williams
 Wings
 Amy Winehouse
 Edgar Winter Group
 Wolf Parade
 Joon Wolfsberg
 Bobby Womack
 Stevie Wonder
 Hawksley Workman
 World Party

X
 X
 XTC
 The xx

Y
Yungblud
Rachael Yamagata
The Yardbirds
Yeah Yeah Yeahs
Yes
Pete Yorn
Young the Giant
Neil Young

Z
Hindi Zahra
Warren Zevon
Zucchero Fornaciari
ZZ Top

References

Adult album alternative